Dirk Müller may refer to:

 Dirk Müller (artist) (born 1946), Dutch sculptor
 Dirk Müller (cyclist) (born 1973), German cyclist
 Dirk Müller (racing driver) (born 1975), German Ford Performance factory racing driver
 Dirk Müller (stock trader) (born 1968), German stock trader, fund manager and bestseller author